This article is a list of fictional characters in the Flash web cartoon series Homestar Runner and episodic video game Strong Bad's Cool Game for Attractive People.

Homestar Runner

Homestar Runner is the title character of the series. A lovable but dense athlete, he has been described by Strong Bad as having an "unbelievably loose grasp on the world around [him]."

Homestar has a white head and a red t-shirt with a white star on it. He either wears long white pants that match his skin tone or no pants at all, and appears to have blue soles on the bottom of his bare feet. He wears a blue hat with a white propeller on the top and a red bill on his head. He lacks visible arms but is nevertheless able to manipulate objects, either through the use of invisible appendages or telekinesis.

His naïvete leads him to be the target of pranks by Strong Bad. His best friend is Pom Pom and he is in an on-again-off-again relationship with Marzipan, though both are often annoyed by his cluelessness. He speaks with a rhotic voice reminiscent of Elmer Fudd.

The Brothers Strong

Strong Bad

Strong Bad is the middle child of the three Strong brothers, the others being Strong Sad and Strong Mad. He typically wears a red lucha libre mask, black pants and his boxing gloves (with which he can type), but no shirt. Strong Bad is almost always accompanied by his pet/sidekick, The Cheat, often while playing pranks on other characters in the series. He often insults his younger brother, Strong Sad, and answers emails sent to him by his fans.

Strong Mad
Strong Mad is an enormous, hyper-muscular, semi-verbal, usually-angry character (much like the Hulk). He is the eldest brother of the brothers Strong; his siblings are Strong Bad and Strong Sad. He often hangs out with The Cheat and helps Strong Bad commit mischief, harass, and occasionally beat up the other characters. He is also the bassist to Marzipan's music group Cool Tapes. However, he appears to at least try to be friendly to other characters when not told to harm them by Strong Bad. He has also proved to possess a sort of childlike innocence, which he has demonstrated by making macaroni pictures and, once, asking if he could keep Bubs' Concession Stand, claiming it followed him home. His body is a rectangle with different dimensions given in different cartoons, with perfectly square shoulders and no distinct head or neck. He has two dots for eyes and giant, bushy eyebrows that are usually angry. His mouth is always partially open revealing three teeth. He wears a purple wrestler's singlet with a white circle in the front containing a large red M and has red shoes. He generally speaks in short, simple sentences, often in an unrestrained roar. His best friend is The Cheat, whom he protects with fervor. He also has a horrible painting in his closet that gives everyone The Jibblies, called the Rocoulm.

Strong Sad
Strong Sad is the younger brother of Strong Bad and Strong Mad. He stands somewhere between Strong Bad and Strong Mad in height, and has large, elephant-like feet he calls "soolnds," which has led Strong Bad to believe he is in some way descended from elephants. His body is round and two shades of gray—a lighter gray from the waist up, a darker gray from the waist down. His head is white and has an odd lump on the top (which Strong Bad refers to as a "disturbing soft serve flip."), and resembles the Manicouagan Reservoir. He is usually very calm and soft-spoken, although is hyperactive when given caffeine.

He is constantly tortured by Strong Bad, who frequently threatens to beat him up (and often does). Strong Bad also calls Strong Sad names such as "Dairy Queen", "The Ghost of Christmas Suck", "Trundle Bed", "Diaper Stripe", and "Theloneus Dump".

In early cartoons, Strong Sad's main defining characteristic is his chronic depression, but has since been known to have high levels of intelligence and creativity. His many interests include listening, books, listening to books, calligraphy, being alone, arts and crafts. Strong Sad also enjoys playing board games, and he seems to enjoy going to science-fiction and fantasy conventions. His isolation has led him to explore his creativity, which is evident in his description of his fictional folk hero Saddy Dumpington.

The Cheat
The Cheat is Strong Bad's sidekick and Strong Mad's best friend. He stands at knee-height to most other characters and is covered with yellow fur with prominent black spots down his back. His arms resemble flippers and he does not have any visible legs. He also has a gold tooth. It is not known what type of "animal" The Cheat is; he seems to belong to his own species. Whenever Strong Bad is abusive to The Cheat, Strong Mad stands up for him. The Cheat lives in The King of Town's grill, which, according to Strong Sad, is a nice place. He can play multiple instruments, such as the flute, drums, and keyboard, and often makes unusual animations that he calls "Powered by The Cheat". In the original book, he helped Strong Bad cheat in the Strongest Man in the World contest, which gave him his name. He is always referred to as The Cheat, not just Cheat, even when being spoken to. The practice even extends to his species.

He speaks in a language consisting entirely of high-pitched squeaks and growls, which the other characters seem to be perfectly able to understand. Subtitles are used whenever The Cheat talks to the camera alone. He often has a hostile attitude towards others, threatening to throw things at them. He often sounds rather full of himself, complimenting himself several times in the majority of his videos. The Cheat, according to Strong Bad, came from a giant egg also filled with a lifetime supply of fish sticks which he won on the same day that he met Homestar Runner in a 10-step foot race to win the egg (which he lost, but got the egg anyway), although it is unknown if this is actually true.

Marzipan
Marzipan is the only major female character in Homestar Runner. She has a handbell-shaped body with her face on the surface of the "handle". Her eyes consist of two black circles of different sizes. Her mouth is usually seen in a slight curve. She wears her hair in a bright yellow-like golden blonde haired ponytail, and is almost always seen wearing a purple dress embellished with white trim and gold buttons, along with a matching hair band. Like Homestar Runner, she does not appear to have visible arms. Nevertheless, she is still able to pick up and handle objects without any hint of difficulty. She is voiced by Missy Palmer and is one of the few characters not voiced by Matt Chapman. The reason she is the only female character is because Missy Palmer cannot do any other voices.

Marzipan is Homestar's on-again, off-again girlfriend, frequently breaking up with him due to his insensitive behavior and obliviousness to her needs before later getting back together with him. In the early days of the website she was listed as the King of Town's daughter; however, in an interview, The Brothers Chaps remarked that this was an idea they had that they did not go through with. She is essentially a feminist "hippie chick", demonstrated in her traits of being vegan who spends much of her time singing and playing her guitar; she is lead singer and guitarist in a band called Cool Tapes. Most of her songs are about happiness and nature. She often makes protest signs to express her views on issues of varying and personal interest. She often tends to fight for political correctness and being eco-friendly, but at times can be hypocritical. Like Strong Bad, she has her own segment called Marzipan's Answering Machine, where the other characters leave messages (such as prank calls) on her answering machine.

Bubs
Bubs is a businessman who owns Bubs' Concession Stand, which offers a constantly changing variety of goods and services. He has a round blue head and mismatched eyes (his right eye is white with a blue iris while his left is simply a black dot). His upper body is orange, and he has "flipper arms." He has a green stripe around his middle which, according to Strong Bad's Cool Game for Attractive People, is a belt, and his lower half is colored dark gray. His voice is reminiscent of Redd Foxx from Sanford and Son or Rochester of The Jack Benny Show fame.

Always ready to make a quick buck, Bubs will sell anything, including letters off the sign on his stand. Besides the Concession Stand, he seems to run a few other businesses on the side, many of which are decidedly shady in nature. This includes performing almost any service that someone wants done, such as being a "questionable doctor" or a "paranormal investigator." It is implied that he is often involved in destroying and/or covering up evidence of crimes. He also sells bologna sandwiches from his truck to the other residents of Free Country, USA. His best friend appears to be Coach Z, although the coach often gets on his nerves. He has an alter ego of "the Thnikkaman", though nobody (with the occasional exception of Homestar) knows that the Thnikkaman is just Bubs in sunglasses with a piece of paper taped to his chest that says "tH".

Coach Z
Coach Z is the eccentric "coach" of the residents of Free Country, USA, though it is unclear exactly what he coaches. He has a strong Upper Midwestern accent, which sometimes gets him into trouble and is thought to be fake, and frequently mispronounces words to increasingly ludicrous degrees. He almost never says anything negative to anyone, and he often offers more encouragement than is needed. He wears a blue and purple baseball cap and a large gold "Z" emblem around his waist, but it is unclear whether his bright green color is his skin or a body suit.

Coach Z also seems to have mental and gender confusion problems, as evidenced by his time spent "talking to his parents" on a disconnected telephone, and claiming to be a mother. He has even stated on one occasion that he sometimes "forgets what's real, and what's just in [his] head". He also has trouble managing his money, causing his electricity to be shut off one year. He is quite lonely and has an unrequited crush on Marzipan, very often making inappropriate romantic gestures to her, especially on her answering machines. He is very fond of hip-hop and often refers to it in conversation. He is also an aspiring rapper, recording several songs, including "These Peoples Try to Fade Me", "Hip-Hop Dance", "Rap Song", and "Fish Eye Lens (ft. Strong Bad)".

Pom Pom
Pom Pom is a Pom from the Isle of Pom. Pom Pom, like all Poms, appears to be inflated. His body consists of a yellow sphere with an orange stripe. His oval head, triangular arms and feet are the same color orange. Pom Pom's eyes are black ovals and he has no visible mouth. He talks by making bubbly noises that only the characters can understand and can absorb objects into his body for storage. Along with Marzipan and The Poopsmith, Pom Pom is the only main character not voiced by Matt Chapman; his 'voice' is a recycled sound clip of Mike Chapman blowing bubbles in milk. Pom Pom is Homestar Runner's best friend, but he sometimes hangs out with Strong Bad as well. It has been hinted that Pom Pom is a superb athlete, martial artist, and rich to boot. His nationality has been vaguely hinted at a variety of times: his parents are known as General and Fräulein Pom Pom. His father owns a film production company which allows Pom Pom to direct indie films. He appears in the game Dangeresque Roomisode 1: Behind the Dangerdesque, as a take-out guy. He makes a cameo in the beginning cutscene of Poker Night at the Inventory as he leaves a previous poker game before you arrive.

The King of Town
The King of Town is the self-proclaimed ruler of Free Country, USA. His head is completely white, with black lines for eyes, a mustache and a beard (though it has been suggested that the white is fur or hair, as he has pink flesh underneath). He wears a gold crown and what appears to be a red robe with white trim with no arms. He is a known glutton that will eat almost anything in front of him (including toilet paper and other inedible items) and anything with the word "butter" in its name. Apparently, the only foods he doesn't like are those which contain peas. He tends to speak with an older but jolly tone of voice, usually saying "doo hoo hoo hoo" to represent his hearty laughter. He apparently got overweight by eating the lifetime supply of fishsticks that was in the egg that contained The Cheat.

The Poopsmith
The Poopsmith is a character whose job is the King of Town's "poopsmith," though it is never explained what this actually entails. His body is peach-colored and egg-shaped, and he has small blue legs and feet, a white head, and an enormous underbite. He always wears a pair of large orange gloves stained with "whatsit," which has been implied to be feces, and he is usually seen carrying a large shovel used to dig through a pile of whatsit outside the King's castle.

The Poopsmith has taken a vow of silence and therefore almost never speaks. He does occasionally hold up signs to communicate, however, and is sometimes seen poking his shovel as a half-gesture. However, in "email thunder", the 200th Strong Bad Email, he breaks his vow to sing the opening song, and speaks again later when calling Marzipan. In these instances, he is voiced by John Linnell of They Might Be Giants. He does not seem to ever display any emotions or facial expressions.

Homsar
Homsar is an enigmatic dwarf with red shoes, blue shirt and a bowler hat. Homsar's speech consists almost entirely of non sequiturs, seen when he claims to be the captain of the "Gravy Train" and a "song from the sixties," more often than not prefaced by a bizarre "ah-ahh-ahh!" uttering, although it is revealed in Strong Badia the Free that Homsar is actually an intelligent being, with his way of speaking being a language of his own. However, he has also shown to be capable of speaking coherently over Marzipan's answering machine, during which he refers to his usual manner of speaking as "garbage." Strong Bad claims that Homsar's parents are a cup of coffee and a Chipwich, although the former was not confirmed by Homsar himself. He seems to have the super power of being incredibly awkward, and often defies the laws of physics. In most of his appearances, his hat will either change shape to something, or move around on its own, often orbiting his head. He was created when a fan accidentally misspelled Homestar Runner's name in the second Strong Bad Email, "homsar".

Senor Cardgage
Senor Cardgage is a character who looks like a taller Strong Bad with a protruding gut, goatee, glasses, and a comb-over. He first appeared in the Strong Bad Email "kind of cool" when Strong Bad was asked if he wasn't the "stylish, buff, handsome man in a wrestling mask" that he is. He usually speaks in a way that is "almost one word and not quite another." He is not one of the twelve main characters, and as such, he does not have his own character video, though Strong Bad attempts to make one in the email "too cool".

Teen Girl Squad
The Teen Girl Squad is the titular cast of a comic series drawn by Strong Bad. They often hang out, trying to complete whatever teen girl cliché is thrown at them. They are often killed in bizarre and gruesome ways. They were introduced in the Strong Bad Email "comic". The members of the squad are:

Cheerleader: The de facto leader. She is the "Mean Popular Girl" stereotype. She is obsessed with getting a boyfriend, on constantly lies to impress them, but this often leads to her demise.
So and So: The smart one. Her parents are divorced and she has been sent to prison for shoplifting once.
What's her Face: The socially awkward one. She seems to play the straight man to her friends' antics. She is going out with "Sci-fi Greg".
The Ugly One: The optimistic one. In the tenth episode, she is shown to be very attractive when she dresses up, to the point where Strong Bad was making out with the paper she was drawn on.

References

External links
 Characters at Homestar Runner Wiki

Animated characters
Lists of animated characters
Homestar Runner